410th may refer to:

410th Air Expeditionary Operations Group, provisional United States Air Force unit assigned to Air Combat Command
410th Air Expeditionary Wing (410 AEW), provisional United States Air Force unit assigned to Air Combat Command
410th Bombardment Squadron, inactive United States Air Force unit
410th Canadian Tactical Fighter Training Squadron, nicknamed the "Cougars", a Royal Canadian Air Force aircraft squadron, Cold Lake, Alberta
410th Fighter Squadron or 195th Fighter Squadron flies the F-16C Block 25 Fighting Falcon
410th Flight Test Squadron (410 FLTS) was part of the 412th Test Wing based at Edwards Air Force Base, California
410th Support Brigade (United States), support brigade of the United States Army

See also
410 (number)
410 (disambiguation)
410, the year 410 (CDX) of the Julian calendar
410 BC